Tabaré Quintans (born 9 May 1910, date of death unknown) was an Uruguayan basketball player. He competed in the 1936 Summer Olympics.

References

External links

1910 births
Year of death missing
Basketball players at the 1936 Summer Olympics
Olympic basketball players of Uruguay
Uruguayan men's basketball players
Place of birth missing